Terrance Gilbert Dillon (August 18, 1941 – May 28, 1964) was a defensive back in the National Football League (NFL). Dillon played with the Minnesota Vikings during the 1963 NFL season. He had also been drafted in the 19th round of the 1963 American Football League Draft by the Oakland Raiders.

In 1965, Minnesota Vikings linebacker Rip Hawkins received the first "Terry Dillon" award given by the Minnesota Vikings in honor of their late teammate. The award symbolizes Dillon's qualities of dedication, self-sacrifice and ability.

References

1941 births
1964 deaths
Accidental deaths in Montana
American football defensive backs
Deaths by drowning in the United States
Minnesota Vikings players
Montana Grizzlies football players
Players of American football from Wisconsin
Sportspeople from Waukesha, Wisconsin